Thomas James Murphy Jr. (born April 3, 1991) is an American professional baseball catcher for the Seattle Mariners of Major League Baseball (MLB). He previously played for the Colorado Rockies. Prior to playing professionally, Murphy played college baseball for the University at Buffalo.

Amateur career
Murphy attended Paul V. Moore High School in Central Square, New York, where he played for the school's baseball team. He had a .510 batting average in his senior year, and was honored as All-Central New York (CNY) and the CNY Athlete of the Year. In high school, Murphy was recruited to play college baseball at Buffalo, St. John’s, Michigan, Wagner, Le Moyne and Monmouth.

Murphy ultimately committed to play baseball at the University at Buffalo. In the summer of 2010, he played summer league baseball with the Oneonta Outlaws of the New York Collegiate Baseball League. In 2011, he was named the Mid-American Conference Baseball Player of the Year after leading the conference with a .384 batting average. That summer, he played for the Holyoke Blue Sox of the New England Collegiate Baseball League (NECBL), and hit a home run off of Kevin Gausman over the Green Monster at Fenway Park against the United States Collegiate National Team in the NECBL All-Star Game.

Professional career

Colorado Rockies
The Colorado Rockies selected Murphy in the third round, with the 105th overall selection, of the 2012 MLB draft. In 2012, he played for the Tri-City Dust Devils of the Class A-Short Season Northwest League.

In 2013, he plays for the Asheville Tourists of the Class A South Atlantic League (SAL), where he was named SAL Hitter of the Week for the week of April 29 through May 5, 2013. He received a midseason promotion to the Tulsa Drillers of the Class AA Texas League.

In 2014, Murphy returned to Tulsa, but was limited to 27 games as a result of a shoulder injury.

In 2015, he began the season with the Rockies' new Class AA affiliate, the New Britain Rock Cats of the Eastern League. He was chosen to play for the United States national baseball team in the 2015 Pan American Games. Following the Pan American Games, the Rockies promoted Murphy to the Albuquerque Isotopes of the Class AAA Pacific Coast League.

The Rockies promoted Murphy to the MLB on September 11, 2015. Murphy made his MLB debut on September 12 against the Seattle Mariners at Safeco Field. Murphy hit his first MLB home run on September 19 at Coors Field off San Diego Padres pitcher Marcos Mateo.

Prior to the 2016 season, Baseball America ranked him the 97th best prospect in MLB. He missed substantial time during the 2016 season due to an oblique injury suffered at the end of spring training.

Seattle Mariners
Murphy was claimed off waivers by the San Francisco Giants on March 25, 2019. On March 28, Murphy was designated for assignment after failing to make the Opening Day roster. The next day, the Giants traded Murphy to the Seattle Mariners for Jesus Ozoria. Murphy excelled upon being acquired by Seattle, as he set career highs offensively including hitting 18 home runs and driving in 40 RBI in 75 games.

Murphy missed the entire 2020 season, staying on the injured list with a fractured metatarsal in his left foot.

On January 13, 2023, Murphy agreed to a one-year, $1.625 million contract with the Mariners, avoiding salary arbitration.

Personal life
Murphy was raised by his parents, Kelly and Tom Sr., in West Monroe, New York. The family are fans of the New York Yankees.

Murphy and his wife, Lindsay, have one daughter and one son together and reside in Constantia, New York.

References

External links

1991 births
Living people
Albuquerque Isotopes players
Asheville Tourists players
Baseball players at the 2015 Pan American Games
Baseball players from New York (state)
Buffalo Bulls baseball players
Colorado Rockies players
Major League Baseball catchers
New Britain Rock Cats players
Pan American Games medalists in baseball
Pan American Games silver medalists for the United States
People from Oswego County, New York
Seattle Mariners players
Tri-City Dust Devils players
Tulsa Drillers players
United States national baseball team players
Medalists at the 2015 Pan American Games